The 1999 SEC Men’s Basketball Tournament took place from March 4–7, 1999 at the Georgia Dome in Atlanta, Georgia. The Kentucky Wildcats men's basketball team won the tournament and the SEC’s automatic bid to the 1999 NCAA Men’s Division I Basketball Tournament by defeating the Arkansas Razorbacks by a score of 76–63.

Television coverage 
The first round, the quarterfinals, and the semifinals were regionally televised and syndicated by Jefferson Pilot Sports, in its 13th season in syndicating SEC Basketball games. The championship game was televised nationally on CBS.

Tournament notes 
This was Tubby Smith’s second SEC tournament title win as the head coach of the Kentucky Wildcats men’s basketball team.

Bracket

References

SEC men's basketball tournament
1998–99 Southeastern Conference men's basketball season
March 1999 sports events in the United States
1999 in sports in Georgia (U.S. state)
1999 in Atlanta
College basketball tournaments in Georgia (U.S. state)
Basketball competitions in Atlanta